Hasibe Özlem Eren (born 6 June 1975) is a Turkish actress. She starred in the Show TV animated series Sıdıka in 1997. Eren played the role of Makbule on the show Avrupa Yakası.

Life and career 
Hasibe Eren graduated from Istanbul University, Department of Market Research and Advertising. Later, she graduated from the School of Letters, Department of Theater Criticism and Dramaturgy. In 2010, she graduated from Bahçeşehir University Advanced Acting Master's Program.

Eren first rose to prominence with her role as a voice actress in the 1997 Show TV animated series Sıdıka. Since 1996, she has been working at the children's education unit of the Istanbul City Theatres.

She was later cast in the movie Anlat İstanbul, appearing in the segment inspired by the story of Cinderella. She also served as an acting coach for Ece Hakim and Azra Akın in the same movie, and later coached Ege Tanman for her role in Babam ve Oğlum. Between 2006 and 2008, she was a regular on Avrupa Yakası, portraying the role of Makbule.

She started her career as a TV presenter by presenting the Bir Zamanlar Türkiye program on 24 in 2008. Between 2010 and 2011, she played the role of Gülizar on the TRT 1 series Yerden Yüksek. From 2011 to 2014, she was a regular on the Kanal D series Yalan Dünya, portraying the character Gülistan. In 2016, she appeared as Emel on the ATV series Aile İşi, which ended in May 2016.

Theatre 
 Arzunun Onda Dokuzu
 Yaşar Ne Yaşar Ne Yaşamaz (play)|Yaşar Ne Yaşar Ne Yaşamaz
 Rumuz Goncagül
 Yeditepeli Aşk

Filmography 
 Hazine 2022
 Güldür Güldür Nazlı 2022–
 Hakim Gülbahar Yalçın 2022
 Sen Ben Lenin Meryem 2021
 Jet Sosyete Pelin Soner / Şennur Yılmaz / Gülnur Kühn 2018–2020
 Türk Malı Bakiye Çekirdek 2017
 Aile İşi Emel 2016
 Kara Bela Kudret'in karısı 2015
 Pazarları Hiç Sevmem Reyhan 2012
 Yalan Dünya Gülistan 2011–2014
 Yerden Yüksek Gülizar 2010 
 Adab-ı Muaşeret
 Anlat İstanbul
 Kıskanmak 2009
 Usta Hilal 2008
 Avrupa Yakası Makbule Kıral 2006–2009
 Yağmur Zamanı Turna 2004
 Oyuncak Fabrikası 2003
 Kibar Ana 2002
 Canım Kocacığım 2002
 Aşk Meydan Savaşı İclal 2002
 Şaşı Felek Çıkmazı Nurşim 2000
 Sıdıka Sıdıka Saka 1997

Awards 

 2007: 34th Golden Butterfly Awards - Best Comedy Actress

References

External links 
 
 

1975 births
Turkish stage actresses
Turkish film actresses
Turkish television actresses
Living people